Heidi Roizen (born 1958) is a Silicon Valley executive, venture capitalist, and entrepreneur.

She is known for speaking out against the harassment of women in technology, having herself received harassment  in the past.

Early life
Roizen was born in 1958 in Stanford, California. She graduated from Stanford University in 1980 with a bachelor's degree in English and earned her MBA from the Stanford University Graduate School of Business three years later.

Career
From 1983 to 1996, Roizen co-founded, together with her brother Peter Roizen, the T/Maker Company, which made software for CP/M and MS-DOS computers, and later for the Apple Macintosh. From 1987 until 1994, Roizen also served on the board of directors of the Software Publishers Association and was its president from 1988 to 1990.

From 1996 to 1997, Roizen was Vice President of World Wide Developer Relations for Apple Inc. She also served on the board of Great Plains Software from 1997 until its acquisition by Microsoft in 2001.

Roizen entered the venture capital world in 1999, first as a Managing Director of SOFTBANK Venture Capital (which became Mobius Venture Capital), from 1999 to 2007, and then in 2012 she joined global investor Draper Fisher Jurvetson as a venture partner.

She also launched her own entrepreneurial venture, SkinnySongs,
In September 2008, the Forum for Women Entrepreneurs and Executives awarded Heidi Roizen their annual Achievement Award.

In June 2009, Roizen was elected to the Board of Directors of TiVo (NASDAQ:TIVO), and in September, 2012, she was elected to the board of DMGT (LSE:DMGT), the London-based global media and information company which owns the Daily Mail and Mail Online. At the time she was elected, she became the first female director in the company's 116-year history.

In 2010, Roizen was named a Lecturer and Entrepreneurship Educator at Stanford University, where she teaches the course 'Spirit of Entrepreneurship' in the MS&E (Engineering) department.

Roizen was awarded 2018 Financial Woman of the Year by Financial Women of San Francisco.

References

External links
 Heidi Roizen’s personal website
Forum for Women Entrepreneurs & Executives Gives Roizen Achievement Award for 2008
Interview on Fresh Dialogues Nov 2008 re. Skinny Songs
 Fresh Dialogues Interview Dec 2008 re. Tips for Entrepreneurs
Entrepreneurial Heroes podcast interview with NCWIT
 Forbes.com - Untold Stories About Steve Jobs: Friends and Colleagues Share Their Memories
 Forbes.com - Heidi Roizen, Looking Outside Silicon Valley 'Cocoon,' Joins Daily Mail's Board
 Forbes.com - How To Build A Unicorn From Scratch -- And Walk Away With Nothing
medium.com - What *not* to do in a venture pitch meeting

1958 births
Living people
American computer businesspeople
Apple Inc. employees
Stanford Graduate School of Business alumni
People from Stanford, California
American venture capitalists
American women investors
21st-century American businesswomen
21st-century American businesspeople
20th-century American businesswomen
20th-century American businesspeople